Moțpan is a Moldovan surname. Notable people with the surname include:
Dumitru Moțpan (1940–2018), Moldovan politician
Efim Moțpan (born 1971), Moldovan racewalker
Nichita Moțpan (born 2001), Moldovan footballer

Surnames of Moldovan origin